Red bean ice is a drink commonly found in Hong Kong. It is usually served in restaurants like cha chaan teng. It is a popular dessert in the summer. The standard ingredients include adzuki beans, light rock sugar syrup, and evaporated milk. It is often topped with ice cream to become a dessert known as red bean ice cream.

Origin
Red bean ice tea has been around since the 1970s. Some places which serve the drink add in chewy flavored jelly.

See also
 Red bean soup
 Ice kachang
 List of legume dishes

References

1970 establishments in Hong Kong
Hong Kong cuisine
Hong Kong drinks
Hong Kong inventions
Non-alcoholic mixed drinks